Hermann Gösmann (9 January 1904 – 21 January 1979) was a German lawyer and football administrator, and from 1962 to 1975 he was president of the German Football Association (DFB).

Gösmann participated along with Franz Kremer, then president of 1. FC Köln, and Hermann Neuberger, the eventual successor from Gösmann, in the founding of the Bundesliga. Gösmann was a lawyer by profession. He was elected president during a DFB-Bundestag on July 28, 1962 in the Westfalenhallen in Dortmund. Also during this Bundestag the Bundesliga was founded.

The Bundesliga scandal in the 1970s was during his tenure. Gösmann had offices in international sport. In 1964, he was elected to the UEFA Executive Committee and took over as chair in the UEFA Amateur Commission. Four years later Gösmann was reelected. He died at the age of 75 in Osnabrück due to pulmonary embolism. He was buried in the Heger cemetery in Osnabrück.

References

1904 births
1979 deaths
People from Ibbenbüren
People from the Province of Westphalia
German football chairmen and investors
20th-century German lawyers
Commanders Crosses of the Order of Merit of the Federal Republic of Germany